Brodziak is a surname. Notable people with the surname include:

Kenn Brodziak (1913–1999), Australian entrepreneur, promoter, producer, and artist manager
Kyle Brodziak (born 1984), Canadian ice hockey player